The 2020 VFF National Super League is the 10th edition of the VFF National Super League, the highest tier football league in Vanuatu apart from Port Vila. The group stage is scheduled to start in October 2019.

Northern Qualifiers

Luganville

League table

Luganville Top 3
The Top 3 teams from 2019 Luganville Premier League played against each other for two spots in semifinals

 Sia-Raga
 Malampa Revivors
 Vaum United

Malampa Revivors qualified for VFF National Super League

Malampa

Semi-finals
Police vs Lenuk 
Atsal (6) 3-3 (5) Uripiv

Final
Police 5-3 AtsalPolice qualified for National Super LeaguePenama
Penama FA Qualifier is scheduled to be held between 14 and 18 October 2019.

Group stage
The 8 teams were split in two groups with four teams each.

Group A

Results

Group B

Results

Semi-finalsAFC 0-3 LTT RueRue 1-0 All RedsThird-place matchAFC 0-1 All RedsFinalRueRue (4) 2-2 (2) LTTRueRue qualified for 2020 VFF National Super LeagueSanma
6 teams from Sanma Football Association played the qualifier for the VFF National Super League

Group stage

Group A

Results

Group B

Results

Semi-finals
Patuvuti 1-0 Blue River
Suara 3-1 Kole

Final
Patuvuti 4-2 SuaraPatuvuti qualified for National Super LeagueTorba
9 teams from Torba Football Association played the qualifier for the VFF National Super League

Group stage

Group A
Magde
Kings United
Agape
Amicale Sola
Waterfall

Magde 5-1 Waterfall

Group B
Nere
Sigal
Ambasodor
Tanmet

Nere 8-0 Tanmet

Semi-finals
Nere 2-1 Magde
Waterfall vs Unknown

Final
Nere 1-2 WaterfallWaterfall qualified for National Super LeagueSouthern Qualifiers

Port Vila

Shefa

Efaté Play-off

South Efaté League
Eraniao was crowned champion of South Efate League and qualified for Efaté PlayoffNorth Efaté League
Kings was crowned champion of South Efate League and qualified for Efaté PlayoffResultsKings vs Eraniao - 11 NovemberEraniao vs Kings - 13 November

Epi Top 4
Four teams from Epi Football League play the Top 4.

Results

Tafea

Tafea Qualifier
Four teams from Tafea Football Association played the Tafea Qualifier. LL Echo qualified for 2020 VFF National Super League'''

Results

National Super League

Qualified Teams

See also
2019–20 Port Vila Premier League

References

VFF National Super League seasons
Vanuatu
2019–20 in Vanuatuan football